Naum Akimovich Senyavin (Наум Акимович Сенявин in Russian) (c. 1680 – ) was a Vice Admiral (1727) of the Imperial Russian Navy.

Naum Senyavin began his military career as a soldier of the Preobrazhensky regiment in 1698. Soon, he became a sailor, joined the Baltic Fleet, and was then promoted to the rank of non-commissioned officer. Naum Senyavin first distinguished himself during the Great Northern War of 1700–1721. In 1713, he was appointed commander of a battleship. As a squadron commander, Senyavin forced three Swedish ships to surrender during the Battle of Ösel in 1719. In 1721, he became a member of the Admiralty Board (Адмиралтейств-коллегия). In 1728–1732, Senyavin commanded a galley fleet. In September 1737, he was appointed commander of the Dnieper Flotilla during the Russo-Turkish War of 1735-1739.

Peter the Great gave some lands close to Saint Petersburg to Senyavin, and the estate became known as the selo of Sinyavino. The selo was destroyed during World War II and never restored, but the name was transferred in the 1920s to the settlement of Sinyavino which was serving peat production. Currently it is an urban-type settlement in Kirovsky District of Leningrad Oblast, Russia.

References

Imperial Russian Navy admirals
1680s births
1738 deaths
Russian military personnel of the Great Northern War